In enzymology, a quercetin-3,3'-bissulfate 7-sulfotransferase is an enzyme that catalyzes the chemical reaction

3'-phosphoadenylyl sulfate + quercetin 3,3'-bissulfate  adenosine 3',5'-bisphosphate + quercetin 3,7,3'-trisulfate

Thus, the two substrates of this enzyme are 3'-phosphoadenylyl sulfate and quercetin 3,3'-bissulfate, whereas its two products are adenosine 3',5'-bisphosphate and quercetin 3,7,3'-trissulfate.

This enzyme belongs to the family of transferases, specifically the sulfotransferases, which transfer sulfur-containing groups.  The systematic name of this enzyme class is 3'-phosphoadenylyl-sulfate:quercetin-3,3'-bissulfate 7-sulfotransferase. Other names in common use include flavonol 7-sulfotransferase, 7-sulfotransferase, and PAPS:flavonol 3,3'/3,4'-disulfate 7-sulfotransferase.

References 

 

EC 2.8.2
Enzymes of unknown structure
Quercetin